Enveitg is a commune in the Pyrénées-Orientales department in southern France.

Geography

Localization 
Enveitg is located in the canton of Les Pyrénées catalanes and in the arrondissement of Prades.

Transport 
Latour-de-Carol-Enveitg train station is adjacent to the village. The station has the distinction of serving three separate routes (SNCF from Toulouse, RENFE from Barcelona and the Train Jaune from Villefranche-de-Conflent), each with a different track gauges. This requires through passengers and freight to change trains. In addition, before Spain's accession to the European Union and the Schengen Agreement, customs and immigration checks were performed; these are no longer necessary, so the people required for these have been withdrawn, leading to a decline in population and activity. Another station in the commune is Béna Fanès station, on the line to Villefranche-de-Conflent.

Population

See also
Communes of the Pyrénées-Orientales department

References

Communes of Pyrénées-Orientales